Silas Wright Lamoreux or Lamoreaux (March 8, 1843 – August 5, 1909) was an American lawyer from Wisconsin who served as a judge, as a local official, as a member of the Wisconsin State Assembly and as the 28th Commissioner of the General Land Office of the United States. He was the brother of Oliver Lamoreux, who served in the same session of the Wisconsin Assembly.

Biography
Silas W. Lamoreux was born in Lenox, New York, on March 8, 1843, and came to Plover, Wisconsin, in 1852 with his family to join his older brother Oliver, who had moved to Wisconsin the year before. The family relocated to Mayville, Wisconsin, a year later. He moved to Dodge County, Wisconsin, and was admitted to the bar at age 21. He enlisted in the Union Army in 1864, and participated with the Army of the Potomac during the American Civil War.

Lamoreux was elected as a Democratic member of the Wisconsin State Assembly from the 5th Dodge County district in 1871, in the same election which saw his brother elected from Portage County. He did not run for re-election in 1872.

Lamoreux was elected judge in his county in 1877. He was appointed commissioner of the General Land Office by President Grover Cleveland (a Democrat), serving from 1893 to 1897.

Lamoreux founded the Beaver Dam Malleable Iron Works, which employed 750 men at the time of his death. He also was president of the German National Bank of Beaver Dam. He died of blood poisoning in Beaver Dam on August 5, 1909, after a long illness with diabetes.

References

External links

1909 deaths
1843 births
Politicians from Beaver Dam, Wisconsin
People of Wisconsin in the American Civil War
Wisconsin lawyers
Businesspeople from Wisconsin
Democratic Party members of the Wisconsin State Assembly
Wisconsin state court judges
General Land Office Commissioners
People from Madison County, New York
Deaths from diabetes
19th-century American politicians
19th-century American businesspeople
19th-century American judges